Qodir Zokirov (July 25, 1906 – August 9, 1992) was a Soviet and Uzbek scientist, botanist, educator and a member of Supreme Soviet of the Soviet Union.

Biography
Qodir Zokirov was born on July 25, 1906 in Jalolobod, Ferghana to the handicraftsman's family. In 1920, he entered a Soviet youth organization, and joined a Likbez campaign.

In 1932, Zokirov graduated from the Pedagogy Academy. In 1937-1941, worked at the Central Asian University, where in 1937 he was appointed as an assistant professor and acting head of the department of botany of Samarkand State University. From 1943 to 1952 he was the head of botany department of the Tashkent State University of Pedagogy. In 1952, he was appointed as Director of the Institute of Botany. He also served as a member of Supreme Soviet of the Soviet Union (1959–63).

Qodir Zokirov died on August 9, 1992 in Tashkent, aged 86.

External links
 Biography of Qodir Zokirov 

1906 births
1992 deaths
People from Andijan
People from Fergana Oblast
Academic staff of Samarkand State University
Recipients of the Order of the Red Banner of Labour
Botanists with author abbreviations
Soviet botanists
Soviet scientists
Uzbekistani scientists